Las Bóvedas (the domes) is the local name for the remains of some Roman baths near San Pedro de Alcántara in Andalusia, Southern Spain.
 
They are located close to the Paleo-Christian Basilica, Vega del Mar. Historians are still unsure of the baths' true origins, though most believe that they are all that remain of the Roman settlement known as Cilniana (or Silniana) destroyed by an earthquake in 365 AD. They can be visited along with the better conserved Villa Romana (Roman villa).

Roman sites in Spain
Archaeological sites in Andalusia
Buildings and structures in Marbella